Cheraghlu (also Romanized as Cherāghlū; also known as Cherāghlī) is a village in Rudqat Rural District, Sufian District, Shabestar County, East Azerbaijan Province, Iran. At the 2006 census, its population was 47, in 9 families.

References 

Populated places in Shabestar County